William C. Andrews (1901–1986) was a British art director who designed film sets for a number of productions. During the 1940s he frequently worked for producer Herbert Wilcox. Later in his career he was generally credited as Bill Andrews.

Selected filmography

 The Day Will Dawn (1942)
 Squadron Leader X (1943)
 Escape to Danger (1943)
 Yellow Canary (1943)
 Hotel Reserve (1944)
 It Happened One Sunday (1944)
 Great Day (1945)
 I Live in Grosvenor Square (1945)
 Gaiety George (1946)
 Piccadilly Incident (1946)
 The Courtneys of Curzon Street (1947)
 Mine Own Executioner (1947)
 Spring in Park Lane (1948)
 Elizabeth of Ladymead (1948)
 Maytime in Mayfair (1949)
 The Black Rose (1950)
 Into the Blue (1950)
 Odette (1950)
 The Lady with a Lamp (1951)
 Derby Day (1952)
 Trent's Last Case (1952)
 The Beggar's Opera (1953)
 Laughing Anne (1953)
 Trouble in the Glen (1954)
 Lilacs in the Spring (1954)
 King's Rhapsody (1955)
 Anastasia (1956)
 Zarak (1956)
 Island in the Sun (1957)
 The Silent Enemy (1958)
 The Horse's Mouth (1958)
 The House of the Seven Hawks (1959)
 I'm All Right Jack (1959)
 Dentist in the Chair (1960)
 The War Lover (1962)
 Murder Ahoy (1964)
 The Early Bird (1965)
 The Alphabet Murders (1965)
 Submarine X-1 (1968)
 Attack on the Iron Coast (1968)
 Hot Millions (1968)
 Mosquito Squadron (1969)
 Captain Nemo and the Underwater City (1969)
 My Lover, My Son (1970)

References

Bibliography
 McFarlane, Brian. Lance Comfort. Manchester University Press, 1999.
 McNulty, Thomas. Errol Flynn: The Life and Career. McFarland, 2011.

External links

1901 births
1986 deaths
British art directors
People from London